Moelva is a river in Ringsaker municipality in Innlandet county, Norway.

See also
List of rivers in Norway

References

Ringsaker
Rivers of Innlandet